Heydarabad-e Mohammad Shir (also Romanized as Ḩeydarābād-e Moḩammad Shīr; also known as Ḩeydarābād) is a village in Kongor Rural District, in the Central District of Kalaleh County, Golestan Province, Iran. At the 2006 census, its population was 969, in 229 families.

References 

Populated places in Kalaleh County